Reuben Phillips may refer to:

 Reuben Phillips (musician), American jazz saxophonist
 Reuben Phillips (squash player), English squash player
 Reuben Jasper Phillips, American marine